The Pune District Education Association is an Indian educational organization, based in Pune, Maharashtra.

It is the administrative authority for a large number of schools and colleges.

Foundation
  It was founded on 7 September 1941 by educationalist Reverend Baburaoji Gholap, Annasaheb Aawate and their colleagues.

Mission
The association's mission is to provide highly recognized knowledge centers of learning resources for primary to post-graduation education. The association sticks to their purpose and firm belief in up-lifting literacy in socio-economically weaker sections of the society.

Accreditation
All the association's schools are affiliated to the Maharashtra State Board of Secondary and Higher Secondary Education, the Maharashtra State Board of Technical Education; and the colleges to Pune University.

See also

 List of educational institutions in Pune

References

External links
 , the association's official website

1941 establishments in India
Educational organisations in Maharashtra
Education in Pune
Non-profit organisations based in India
Organisations based in Pune
Educational institutions established in 1941